Cameron Bernard Porter (born May 23, 1993) is a retired American soccer player.

Career

College
Porter spent four years playing college soccer at Princeton University between 2011 and 2014. During his time at Princeton, Porter was named 2013 First-Team All-Ivy League, 2013 Academic All-Ivy and 2014 ECAC Offensive Player of the Year.
While at Princeton, Porter majored in Computer Science and was a member of the Ivy Club.

Professional
On January 15, 2015, Porter was drafted in the third round (45th overall) of the 2015 MLS SuperDraft by Montreal Impact. He signed a contract with the club on February 7, 2015. Porter made his professional debut on February 24, 2015 as an 81st-minute substitute during a 2-2 draw against Pachuca in the CONCACAF Champions League. He scored his first professional goal on March 3, 2015, in stoppage time (90+4) from a long Calum Mallace pass, at home (in the Olympic Stadium) in the second leg against Pachuca; with this strike, he tied the game and made the Impact win the series on away goals, giving the team its first CONCACAF Champions League semi-final berth. Later that night on post match press conference Porter described his goal as "a dream come true".

On March 21, 2015, in a game against the New England Revolution, Porter suffered an injury in the first half and was taken out of the game. He underwent surgery on his left knee to repair an ACL tear. He missed the entire 2015 season.

Porter was traded to Sporting Kansas City on July 12, 2016, in exchange for Amadou Dia.

On January 29, 2018, he announced his professional retirement at the early age of 24.

References

External links
 

1993 births
Living people
American soccer players
American expatriate soccer players
Association football forwards
Expatriate soccer players in Canada
FC Montreal players
Major League Soccer players
CF Montréal draft picks
CF Montréal players
People from Centerville, Ohio
Princeton Tigers men's soccer players
Soccer players from Ohio
Sporting Kansas City players
Sporting Kansas City II players
USL Championship players